Mousehole is a village and fishing harbour in the civil parish of Penzance, Cornwall, England, UK.

Raginnis

References

Citations

Sources
 
 
 
 
 
 
 
 
 
 
 
 
 
 
 
 
 
 
 
 
 
 
 
 
 
 
 
 
 
 
 
 
 
 
 
 
 
 
 
 
 
 
 
 
 
 
 
 
 
 
 
 
 
 
 
 
 
 
 
 
 
 
 
 
 
 
 
 
 
 
 
 
 
 
 
 
 
 
 
 
 
 
 
 
 
 
 
 
 
 
 
 

 Raginnis
 

Buildings and structures in Penzance
Lists of listed buildings in Cornwall
Listed